Monimus (4th century BC) of Syracuse, was a Cynic philosopher.

Biography
According to Diogenes Laërtius, Monimus was the slave of a Corinthian money-changer who heard tales about Diogenes of Sinope from Xeniades, Diogenes' master.  In order that he might become the pupil of Diogenes, Monimus feigned madness by throwing money around until his master discarded him. Monimus also became acquainted with Crates of Thebes.

He was famous for saying that "everything is vanity" (τῦφος, tuphos, literally 'mist' or 'smoke'). According to Sextus Empiricus, Monimus was like Anaxarchus because they "compared existing things to a scene-painting and supposed them to resemble the impressions experienced in sleep or madness." He said that "it was better to lack sight than education, because under the first affliction, you fall to the ground, under the latter, deep underground," and he also said that "Wealth is the vomiting of Fortune."

He wrote two books: On Impulses, and an Exhortation to Philosophy, and he also wrote some jests mixed with serious themes (presumably related to Cynic-style spoudogeloia).

In book two of Meditations, Marcus Aurelius writes:

Alternate translation by George Long:
"Section II-15. Remember that all is but opinion. For what the Cynic Monimus said is obvious: and obvious too is the use of what he said, if a man accepts what may be got out of it only as far as it is true."

Notes

References

External links

4th-century BC Greek people
4th-century BC philosophers
Classical Greek philosophers
Ancient Syracusans
Cynic philosophers